is a Japanese football player.

Playing career
Ohashi was born in Chiba Prefecture on July 27, 1996. He joined J1 League club Shonan Bellmare in 2018.

References

External links

1996 births
Living people
Chuo University alumni
Association football people from Chiba Prefecture
Japanese footballers
J1 League players
Shonan Bellmare players
Association football forwards